Scottish Youth Theatre is Scotland's national youth theatre company for ages 3–25. It was established in 1976 and has provided theatre training to young people. The company has a free-to-participate National Artistic Programme that covers ages 14–25 and provides opportunities to take part in theatre throughout Scotland.

The Scottish Youth Theatre has headquarters in the Old Sheriff Court in Glasgow but it works throughout Scotland. It has dedicated theatres, rehearsal spaces and offices for arts organisations.

History

The Scottish Youth Theatre started in Edinburgh in December 1976. It moved to the Old Sheriff Court in Wilson Street, Glasgow in 2006.

Mary McCluskey was the theatre's artistic director for 26 years before she retired in 2018.

Following a decision by Creative Scotland to end its funding, and the Scottish Youth Theatre being unable to cover the deficit in their budget, the theatre announced it would cease trading in July 2018. Scottish Youth Theatre was then saved by a decision by the Scottish Government to fund it directly, and by extensive private sponsorship and donations.

Summer Festival takes place during the school holidays in various locations around Scotland and involves theatrical training for two, three or five weeks. 

Alumni of the theatre include Karen Gillan (Dr Who), Jack Lowden (Dunkirk), Jamie Parker (Harry Potter and the Cursed Child) and GLOW's Gayle Rankin.

Patrons
Patrons of Scottish Youth Theatre include:

 Brian Cox (after whom the Brian Cox Theatre within the Scottish Youth Theatre building is named)
 Alan Cumming
 Blythe Duff
 Phyllida Law 
 Liz Lochhead 
 Colin McCredie 
 John Michie 
 Bill Paterson 
 Paul Riley 
 David Rintoul 
 Elaine C Smith 
 Emma Thompson 
 Richard Wilson

Past Productions
 Pinocchio (2009)
 Hidden Treasures (2009)
 Hamlet (2009)
 Geordie (Summer 2008)
 Oh! What A Lovely War (Summer 2008)
 Hero (Summer 2008)
 When A Star Falls (2007–2008)
 His Dark Materials (Philip Pullman Trilogy) (2007)
 Wee MacGreegor (2006)
 Man of the Crowd (2006)
 Tales From The Arabian Nights (2006)
 Geordie (2006)
 The Snow Queen (2005)
The Ugly Ducking (2005)
Into The Light (2005)
Dying For It (2004–2005)
The Lion, The Witch, and the Wardrobe (2004)
Sweeney Todd: The Demon Barber of Fleet Street (2004)
Romeo and Juliet (2003)
Born Bad
The Wizard of Oz (2001)
Hamlet
Macbeth (2000)
The Threepenny Opera (1992) (Dundee Rep)
Tam o' Shanter (1991) (The People's Palace)
Nicholas Nickleby (1991) (The Old Athenaeum)
The Human Cannon (1990) (The Old Athenaeum)
A Midsummer Night's Dream (1990) (The Burrell Collection)
The Dragon (1988) (Aberdeen University)
Romeo and Juliet (1988) (RSAMD Theatre)

References

External links
 Official Website
 Facebook Page

Theatre companies in Scotland
Youth organisations based in Scotland
Youth theatre companies
Organisations supported by the Scottish Government